Ingleborough Cave (formerly known as Clapham Caves) is a show cave close to the village of Clapham in North Yorkshire, England adjacent to where the water from Gaping Gill resurges.

The passage is spacious, and well decorated with stalagmitic formations.

Beyond the show cave, the fossil gallery continues until it meets the main stream. The water can be followed upstream through passages under Trow Gill, to where it emerges from a sump at Terminal Lake which has been connected by divers to Gaping Gill, and followed downstream into Lake Pluto which has been connected by divers to Beck Head Stream Cave.

A connection has also been made with Fox Holes, a cave near Trow Gill.

A  small stream in the show cave drops into a rift called the Abyss. An  underwater connection has been made between the passage at the bottom and Beck Head Cave, the resurgence for the Gaping Gill water.

External  links
  Ingleborough Cave website
  A description of the route to Terminal Lake
  Googlemap of location of all the entrances  into the Gaping Gill system

Tourist attractions in North Yorkshire
Show caves in the United Kingdom
Caves of North Yorkshire